Cavity is an American sludge metal band from Miami, Florida.  They first formed in 1992, releasing a multitude of albums and singles before breaking up in 2003. Steve Brooks and Juan Montoya would go on to play in Torche and Floor. Anthony Vialon, Henry Wilson and Beatriz Monteavaro also played in Floor. Jason Landrian went on to form Black Cobra. 

In 2015, the group reunited and toured the United States for the first time since their dissolution. The group issued their first album since their reunion, titled After Death, through Valley King in 2017.

Discography

Studio albums
 Human Abjection (1995, City of Crime)
 Somewhere Between the Train Station and the Dumping Grounds (1997, Rhetoric)
 SuperCollider (1999, Man's Ruin)
 On the Lam (2001, Hydra Head)
 After Death (2017, Valley King)
Wraith (2019, Valley King)

Singles and EPs
 Cavity demo tape (1992, self-released)
 Scalpel 7-inch (1996, City of Crime)
 Crawling 7-inch (1996, Bacteria Sour)
 Goin' Ann Arbor 7-inch (1996, Rhetoric)
 Sourflower/Damaged III split 7-inch with Daisycutter (1996, Starcrunch)
 Fuck Diablo 7-inch (1997, Arm)
 Wounded 7-inch (1998, No!)
 In These Black Days Volume 4 split 2×7″ with Cable, Jesuit, and Overcast (1998, Hydra Head)
 Laid Insignificant CD (1999, Bacteria Sour) (reissued through Hydra Head in 2008)
 Live split 2×7″ with Bongzilla (1998, Rhetoric)

Compilation albums
 Drowning (1996, Bacteria Sour)
 Miscellaneous Recollections 92-97 (2001, Kapow)

References

External links
 Encyclopaedia Metallum entry
 Cavity on Discogs

American sludge metal musical groups
Musical groups established in 1992
Musical groups disestablished in 2003
Musical groups from Miami
Heavy metal musical groups from Florida